Apicella is a surname. Notable people with the surname include:

Enzo Apicella (1922–2018), Italian-born British artist, cartoonist, designer and restaurateur
Marco Apicella, Italian racing driver
Lucia Apicella, Italian philanthropist 
Manuel Apicella, French chess grandmaster
Lorenzo Apicella, Italian architect